Verner is a Scandinavian name of Germanic origins from the given name Werner.  Verner is common both as a given name and a surname. It means "protector". People with the name Verner include:

Given name

 Verner Clapp
 Verner Clarges
 Ove Verner Hansen
 Verner von Heidenstam
 Verner Emil Hoggatt, Jr.
 Verner Järvinen
 Verner Lehtimäki
 Verner Lindberg (1852–1909), Finnish politician
 Verner Main
 Elmer Verner McCollum
 Percy Verner Noble
 Verner Panton
 Verner E. Suomi
 Verner Weckman
 Gerald Verner White

Surname

 Alterraun Verner (b. 1988), American footballer
 Elizabeth O'Neill Verner (1883–1979), American artist, author
 Frank Verner (1883–1966), American middle and long distance runner
 Frederick Arthur Verner (1836–1928), Canadian painter
 Josée Verner (b. 1959), Canadian politician
 Karl Verner (1846–1896), Danish linguist
 Linda Verner (1855-1892), British singer and actress 
 Mary Verner (b. 1956), American local government politician
 Miroslav Verner (b. 1941), Czech egyptologist
 Paul Verner (1911–1986), German politician
 Samuel Phillips Verner (1873–1943), American missionary and African explorer
 Tomáš Verner (b. 1986), Czech figure skater
 Sir William Edward Hercules Verner, 3rd Baronet (1855–1886), British baronet
 William Willoughby Cole Verner (1852–1922) a British ornithologist

See also
 Werner
 Wernher

References

Masculine given names
Scandinavian masculine given names
Danish-language surnames

da:Verner
sv:Verner